Frontier is a geographical term referring to areas near or beyond a boundary, or of a different nature.

Frontier may also refer to:

Places

North America

Canada
Frontier, Saskatchewan, a Canadian village
Rural Municipality of Frontier No. 19, Saskatchewan, Canada

United States
Frontier, Minnesota, an unincorporated community
Frontier, North Dakota, a city
Frontier, Wyoming, an unincorporated community
American frontier, American westward expansion from 1600 to 1910
Frontier County, Nebraska

Elsewhere
Military Frontier, a borderland of Habsburg Monarchy with the Ottoman Empire

Arts, entertainment, and media

Films
Frontier (1935 film) (Aerograd) directed by Aleksandr Dovzhenko
Frontier(s), a French horror film written and directed by Xavier Gens
The Frontier (1991 film), a Chilean film directed by Ricardo Larraín
The Frontier (2014 film), an American film directed by Matt Rabinowitz
The Frontier (2015 film), an American film directed by Oren Shai

Games
Frontier (pinball), a pinball game manufactured by Bally
Frontier: Elite II, a computer game written by David Braben and published by Gametek
Frontier: First Encounters, a sequel to Frontier: Elite II

Literature
Frontier (novel) by Can Xue
The Frontier (novel), or Granica, a 1935 Polish novel by Zofia Nałkowska

Television

Series
Frontier (1955 TV series), American Western television series produced by Worthington Miner
Frontier (1968 TV series), UK television series
Frontier (2016 TV series), a Canadian television series
Macross Frontier, the third Japanese anime television series set in the Macross anime series universe

Episodes and seasons
"Dark Frontier", season 5, episodes 15 and 16 of Star Trek: Voyager 
"Digimon Frontier", season four of the Digimon: Digital Monsters anime television series

Other uses in arts, entertainment, and media
"Frontier", a song from the album Dead Can Dance by the band Dead Can Dance
The Frontier (website), a non-profit, multi-media platform, investigative journalism organization in Tulsa, Oklahoma

Brands and enterprises
DFJ Frontier, an American venture capital firm
Frontier Communications, a telephone company in the United States
Frontier West Virginia, a subsidiary of Frontier Communications above
Frontier Developments, a British computer and video game development company
Frontier Economics, a specialist economics consultancy
Frontier Natural Products Co-op, a natural foods retailers' cooperative
Frontier Records, a record label
New Frontier Hotel and Casino, defunct hotel and casino, formerly located on the Strip in Las Vegas, Nevada

Organizations
The Frontier (Hong Kong), a political group–party that has been consolidated with the Hong Kong Democratic Party
The Frontier (Hong Kong, 2010), a political group established by former members of the above group

Transportation

Aeronautical
Frontier Aircraft, an aircraft development company, now part of Boeing; also exists as Karem Aircraft Inc.
Frontier Airlines (1950–1986), a former airline
Frontier Airlines, a low-cost airline based at Denver International Airport, Colorado, United States
Frontier Flying Service, an airline headquartered in Fairbanks, Alaska, United States

Other transport
Nissan Frontier, a small–midsize pickup truck produced by Nissan Motors
, several steamships with this name

Other uses
 Frontier (horse), a thoroughbred racehorse
Frontier, an outliner and scripting software environment
Boundary (topology), also called a "frontier", the set of points which can be approached both from S and from outside of S in topology
Frontier Series of Canadian banknotes issued from 2011 onwards
Frontier Thesis, a theory about the meaning of the American frontier
Frontier (supercomputer), a exascale-supercomputer delivered in 2022

See also
Borderland (disambiguation)
Final Frontier (disambiguation)
The Frontier (disambiguation)
Frontiers (disambiguation)